Thirty Years of Adonis, is a 2017 film by the Hong Kong film-maker Scud, the production-crediting name of Danny Cheng Wan-Cheung. It is a story of a young man who is a Beijing Opera actor. He decides to pursue acting, and soon becomes a commercial sex worker for men and women. The movie explores several themes traditionally regarded as 'taboo' in Hong Kong society and features full-frontal male nudity in several scenes. It is the seventh publicly released films by Scud. The six other films are: City Without Baseball in 2008, Permanent Residence in 2009, Amphetamine in 2010, Love Actually... Sucks! in 2011, Voyage in 2013, and Utopians in 2015. The movie features footage from Utopians. The eighth film, Apostles, was made in 2022, as was the ninth, Bodyshop, but neither have yet been released. The tenth and final film, Naked Nations: Hong Kong Tribe, is currently in production.

Plot
Thirty Years of Adonis explores the philosophy of life and death, religious beliefs and karma through an erotically charged story. Yang Ke is a 30-year-old man who dreams of becoming a famous Beijing Opera actor. He is an attractive man who can effortlessly charm both men and women. However, his fate leads him to the underworld as he joins a cult-like society of masculine sex workers. Despite his faith and his willingness to give, he remains a prisoner to his karma. Hell awaits when heaven seems near, and the ultimate truth is revealed in a heart-breaking moment from which there is no return.

Cast
 Adonis He Fei as Yang Ke
 Susan Shaw
 Nora Miao
 Amanda Lee
 Bank Chuang
 Eric East
 Katashi
 Cici Lee
 Justin Lim
 Alan Tang
 Yu Sheng Ting

Production

Although some of the scenes were unmistakably filmed in casinos in Macau, the streets of Hong Kong and temples in Thailand, Thirty Years of Adonis purportedly blurs geographical boundaries by portraying characters speaking different languages and practising different cultures. In addition, the background of the protagonist Ke—born in Shandong and working in a Peking Opera troupe—further confers a sense of universality upon the social issues the film touches on.

Languages

In the movie, four languages are spoken: Hokkien, Mandarin, Cantonese and English.

See also
 List of Hong Kong films of 2017
 List of lesbian, gay, bisexual or transgender-related films
 List of lesbian, gay, bisexual, or transgender-related films by storyline
 Nudity in film (East Asian cinema since 1929)

References

External links

2017 drama films
2017 LGBT-related films
2017 films
2010s Cantonese-language films
Chinese independent films
Chinese-language films
Chinese LGBT-related films
Films directed by Scud (filmmaker)
Films set in Hong Kong
Gay-related films
Hong Kong independent films
Hong Kong LGBT-related films
LGBT-related drama films
Male bisexuality in film
2010s Mandarin-language films
Taiwanese LGBT-related films
Utopian films
Magic realism films
Films about prostitution in China
2010s Hong Kong films